
Goleta Depot is a train station building in Goleta, California constructed by the Southern Pacific Railroad in 1901, as part of the completion of the Coast Route linking Los Angeles and San Francisco. It is a Southern Pacific standard design Two Story Combination Depot No. 22. The building is listed on the National Register of Historic Places and the California Register of Historical Resources and is the centerpiece of the South Coast Railroad Museum.

Southern Pacific closed its Goleta station in the 1970s. Eventually, Goleta Beautiful, a civic organization, obtained rights to the abandoned building which was moved on Nov. 18–19, 1981 to nearby Lake Los Carneros County Park. The park is the site of historic Stow House and Lake Los Carneros with walking trails and bird watching. The station was rehabilitated and restored, reopening in Oct. 1982. At first, the station also housed three local nonprofit organizations, the Goleta Valley Chamber of Commerce, Institute for American Research and Santa Barbara Audubon Society in addition to the museum, in a form of adaptive reuse. Later, the entire building became the home of the South Coast Railroad Museum.

A new train station with a concrete platform and open-air shelter opened nearby in 1998 for Amtrak trains.

See also
 Registered Historic Places in Santa Barbara County
 Southern Pacific Railroad Passenger Station and Freight House in Springfield, Oregon, a similar two-story depot design

References

Further reading
 Bender, Henry E. Jr. (1998) “Southern Pacific Lines Standard Design Depots: Part 1,” SP Trainline 57: 11–26.
 Coombs, Gary B. (1982). Goleta Depot: The History of a Rural Railroad Station. Goleta Beautiful and Institute for American Research. Goleta, California.
 Lawler, Nan (1981). “Closing the Gap,” Railroad History, Bulletin 145: 87–105.
 Potter, Janet Greenstein (1996). Great American Railroad Stations. New York: John Wiley & Sons, Inc., pp. 466–467.
 Sullivan, Steve (1986). “Goleta Depot: A Tribute.” In Those Were the Days: Landmarks of Old Goleta, edited by Gary B. Coombs, 35–44. Goleta, Ca.: Institute for American Research.
 Tompkins, Walker A. (1966). Goleta: The Good Land. Goleta, Calif.: Goleta Amvets Post No. 55.

External links
 Website of the South Coast Railroad Museum at Goleta Depot

Railway stations in Santa Barbara County, California
Goleta, California
Railway stations in the United States opened in 1901
National Register of Historic Places in Santa Barbara County, California
Railway stations on the National Register of Historic Places in California
Stick-Eastlake architecture in California
Former Southern Pacific Railroad stations in California